John Steuart Wilson (January 6, 1913 – August 27, 2002) was an American music critic and jazz radio host. He worked as a music critic for The New York Times for four decades, and was that paper's first critic to write regularly on jazz and other genres of popular music.

Biography
Wilson hosted the nationally syndicated jazz performance radio series, The Manhattan Jazz Hour, which included the artists Phil Woods, Toots Thielemans, Dick Hyman, Sir Roland Hanna, Jim Hall, Joe Williams, Milt Hinton, and other jazz luminaries. The series was taped at The Manhattan Recording Company studio in New York City in 1986 and syndicated nationally by American Public Radio. Wilson interviewed the artists, who also performed live in front of a studio audience for the series.

Wilson died in Princeton, New Jersey at the age of 89.

Bibliography

References

1913 births
2002 deaths
American music critics
Writers from Elizabeth, New Jersey
Radio personalities from New Jersey
The New York Times writers